Susana Muñiz is a Uruguayan physician and politician.

A member of the Broad Front (Communist Party of Uruguay), she was the Minister of Public Health in the cabinet of President José Mujica.

References

External links
 Minister Muñiz 

Uruguayan women physicians
Uruguayan public health doctors
Ministers for Public Health of Uruguay
Women government ministers of Uruguay
Communist Party of Uruguay politicians
Uruguayan pathologists
Women public health doctors